Kennard is a city in Houston County, Texas, United States. Its population was 337 at the 2010 census. The main street is Texas State Highway 7.

Geography

Kennard is located in eastern Houston County at  (31.355866, –95.185384). It is surrounded by Davy Crockett National Forest. State Highway 7 leads west  to Crockett, the county seat, and northeast  to Nacogdoches.

The city is drained by forks of Cochino Bayou, an east-flowing tributary of the Neches River.

Demographics

As of the census of 2000,  317 people, 123 households, and 83 families were residing in the city. The population density was 250.5 people per square mile (96.4/km2). The 159 housing units averaged 125.7/mi2 (48.3/km2). The racial makeup of the city was 74.45% White, 21.77% African American, 0.95% Asian, 1.58% from other races, and 1.26% from two or more races. Hispanics or Latinos of any race were 2.84% of the population.

Of the 123 households,  30.9% had children under the age of 18 living with them, 48.0% were married couples living together, 13.0% had a female householder with no husband present, and 32.5% were not families. About 30.1% of all households were made up of individuals, and 13.8% had someone living alone who was 65 years of age or older. The average household size was 2.58, and the average family size was 3.17.

In the city, the age distribution was 28.4% under  18, 12.0% from 18 to 24, 25.2% from 25 to 44, 22.7% from 45 to 64, and 11.7% who were 65 or older. The median age was 33 years. For every 100 females, there were 93.3 males. For every 100 females age 18 and over, there were 94.0 males.

The median income for a household in the city was $28,125, and for a family was $37,917. Males had a median income of $24,722 versus $25,625 for females. The per capita income for the city was $19,354. About 16.4% of families and 24.3% of the population were below the poverty line, including 39.7% of those under age 18 and 23.7% of those age 65 or older.

Education 
The city is served by the Kennard Independent School District. The Kennard High School teams are known as the Tigers.

Climate
The climate in this area is characterized by hot, humid summers and generally mild to cool winters.  According to the Köppen climate classification, Kennard has a humid subtropical climate, Cfa on climate maps.

References

External links
 Houston County and Crockett Area Chamber of Commerce

Cities in Texas
Cities in Houston County, Texas